White Bostonian Joseph Bradford (1843–1886)  was an American playwright who most famously helped write a landmark production, Out of Bondage, the first African American musical comedy, with Pauline Hopkins and the Hyers Sisters, debuting in 1876. The production featured Sam Lucas, a famous minstrel performer of the era.

Bradford was also an actor, poet and journalist. He wrote for the Boston Courier as "Jay Bee".

Works
New German (1872)
Law in New York (1873)
20,000 Leagues Under the Sea (1874) Libretto
The Conditional Pardon (1875)
Fritz's Brother (1875)
Out of Bondage (1876)
In and Out of Bondage (1877)
Our Bachelors (1877) 
A.A. 1900 (1879)
John Mishler (1882)
One of the Finest (1883)
A Wonderful Woman (1883)
Cherubs (1885)
Rose and Coe (1886)

References

Citations

Sources
 Appletons' Cyclopædia of American Biography – Volume 1 – Page 348
 
 

1843 births
1886 deaths
19th-century American dramatists and playwrights